Thayapola Pillai Noolapola Selai is a 1959 Indian Tamil-language film written and co-produced by A. P. Nagarajan and directed by K. Somu. The film stars Manohar, and was released on 14 April 1959.

Plot

Cast 
Cast adapted from the song book

Male cast
 Manohar
 V. K. Ramasamy
 Sarangapani
 T. K. Ramachandran
 T. N. Sivathanu
 Sayeeram
 M. E. Madhavan
 Ramanathan
 Yadhartham Ponnusami Pillai
 S. V. Rajagopal
 Madhavan Krishnamurthi
 Sivaji Ganesan (Guest)

Female cast
 M. N. Rajam
 Pandari Bai
 P. Kannamba
 C. K. Saraswathi
 Padmini Priyadarshini
 C. T. Rajakantham
 M. S. S. Bhagyam
 Chandra
 Sivakami (Debut)

Production 
Thayapola Pillai Noolapola Selai was produced by V. K. Ramasamy and A. P. Nagarajan under Sri Lakshmi Pictures. Nagarajan also wrote the script, and K. Somu was the director. Cinematography was handled by V. K. Gopanna, and the editing by T. Vijayarangam and K. Durairaj.

Soundtrack 
The soundtrack was composed by K. V. Mahadevan and the lyrics were written by A. Maruthakasi.

Release and reception 
Thayapola Pillai Noolapola Selai was released on 14 April 1959. The Indian Express positively reviewed the film for its script, and the play featuring Ganesan.  Kanthan of Kalki appreciated Nagarajan's writing and Somu's direction.

References

External links 
 

1950s Tamil-language films
Films directed by K. Somu
Films scored by K. V. Mahadevan
Films with screenplays by A. P. Nagarajan